Puerarin, one of several known isoflavones, is found in a number of plants and herbs, such as the root of Pueraria (Radix puerariae) notably of the kudzu plant.

Puerarin is the 8-C-glucoside of daidzein.

List of plants that contain the chemical 
 Pueraria lobata
 Pueraria phaseoloides

Notes and references 

Isoflavone glucosides
Phenol glycosides